The 2009 World Wushu Championships was the 10th edition of the World Wushu Championships. It was held at the Ricoh Coliseum in Toronto, Ontario, Canada from October 25 to October 29, 2009.

Medal summary

Medal table

Men's taolu

Men's sanda

Women's taolu

Women's sanda

References



World Wushu Championships
Wushu Championships
Wushu Championships, 2009
2009 in wushu (sport)
Wushu in Canada